The yoyo loach, Almora loach or Pakistani loach (Botia almorhae) is a freshwater fish belonging to the loach family Botiidae. It originates in the slow-running and still waters of the Ganges basin in northern India and possibly Nepal. Despite the alternative common name Pakistani loach, the true B. almorhae is not known from Pakistan (the species in this country is B. birdi).

The final common name, Almora loach, refers to Almora in Uttarakhand, India. Specimens labelled as B. almorhae are commonly found in the aquarium trade, but most (if not all) of these appear to be the closely related B. lohachata, two possibly undescribed species popularly referred to as B. sp. "Kosi" and B. sp. "Teesta", or hybrids.

See also
 List of freshwater aquarium fish species

References 
 
 

Botiidae
Fish of India
Fish described in 1831
Taxa named by John Edward Gray